Marv Newland (March 9, 1947) is an American-Canadian filmmaker, specialized in animation.

Career

Newland began a career making animated motion pictures in Los Angeles with the creation of the short Bambi Meets Godzilla (1969). He then designed and animated television commercials until late 1970 when he moved to Toronto, Ontario, Canada.

While in Toronto (1970–1972) he designed, directed and animated television commercials for Sesame Street and Educational Television, and segments for longer films. Newland was also one of two designers and storyboard artists on the Cinera Productions cartoon Super Joe (1971). He was a storyboard designer on an unemployment insurance film at Crawley Films in Ottawa, and created designs and layouts for TV commercials for Phos-Cine Productions in New York.

In late 1972 Newland moved to Vancouver, British Columbia, Canada. He spent two years freelancing for local animated film production companies, as well as animation companies in Chicago and Los Angeles. In 1973 Newland created storyboards for the animated television series Barbapapa while at Toonder Studios in the Netherlands.

In 1973 Bambi Meets Godzilla was seen widely across the United States when it was paired with John Magnuson's Thank You Mask Man to be shown along with screenings of Philippe de Broca's feature film King of Hearts. The pairing was created by Randy Finley in Seattle with Specialty Films who distributed the package under the title "The King of Hearts and His Loyal Short Subjects".

In 1975 Newland founded the animated film production company International Rocketship Limited in Vancouver, British Columbia. At Rocketship he produced and directed numerous animated short films including: Sing Beast Sing (1980), Anijam (1984), Hooray for Sandbox Land (1985), Black Hula (1988 - which later featured on an early episode of Liquid Television), Pink Komkommer (1991), and Fuv (1999) Beijing Flipbook (2003), Tete A Tete A Tete (2005), Postalolio (2008), CMYK (2010), Scratchy (2016), Katalog Of Flaws (2019). In 1979 Marv hired Gordon Stanfield Animation (GSA) and later, Gordon went on to bring more animation to Vancouver, British Columbia. The company also produced short animated films for other directors such as Danny Antonucci (Lupo the Butcher, 1987), and J. Falconer (Dog Brain, 1988). Newland also designed and directed the National Film Board of Canada vignette, Bill Miner (1978).

Rocketship also produced TV commercials, promos, and network IDs for clients like MTV, YTV, Nickelodeon, Nick Jr., the Children's Television Workshop, Lifetime, HA! TV Comedy Network, TV Heaven 41, MuchMusic, and Locomotion, pilots for series, and two longer films: Gary Larson's Tales From the Far Side (1994), which won the Grand Prix at the Annecy International Animation Festival in 1996, and a sequel in 1996.

Outside of Rocketship, Newland has freelanced for other animation companies. This work includes directing episodes of the 3D stop motion series, The PJ's, for Will Vinton Studios in Portland, Oregon; The Preacher's Life (1999); Fear of a Black Rat (1999); and Let's Get Ready to Rumba (2001). Newland also created story boards for the Montreal and Vancouver studios of the National Film Board of Canada (1999–2000).

In 2001 Newland produced three animated films by two other directors; Friday Night Idiot Box by Bruce Wilson, and Explodium and My Friend Max by Peter MacAdams. Later projects have included Scratchy and POSTALOLIO (2008), a 2D animated film in which all of the drawings were hand-painted on postcards and sent through the international mail to the film's producer, Frederator Studios in New York City. All of these are International Rocketship Limited Productions.

His film Anijam was included in the Animation Show of Shows.

The Academy Film Archive has preserved several of Marv Newland's films, including Anijam, Bambi Meets Godzilla, and Black Hula.

References

External links 
 
 Marv Newland's MarvCards
 International Rocketship Ltd. archives at the University of Toronto Media Commons

Film producers from British Columbia
Comedy film directors
Parody film directors
Canadian parodists
American parodists
American animators
American film producers
American film directors
American storyboard artists
American animated film directors
American animated film producers
Canadian animated film directors
Canadian animated film producers
Living people
1947 births